Shanqal Fort is a ruined fort near the city of Turubah, Saudi Arabia. The fort is located in the village of Al-Labt, to the east of Turubah valley within the Makkah Region. It is built on the rocky slope which consists the northwestern border of the territory of Al-Baqum tribe, and it reaches 1133 meters above the sea level. Historians consider that the fort was a construction of the wealthy prince belonged to Al-Baqum tribe. Historian Muhammad bin Ghanam considers that the fort was established as a residence of the prince since 1729. Thus, it is likely that it was belonged to the Sheikh Abdurrahman bin Sultan al-Badri.

References

18th-century fortifications
Archaeological sites in Saudi Arabia
Forts in Saudi Arabia
Castles in Saudi Arabia